Chamber (Jonothon Evan Starsmore) is a superhero appearing in American comic books published by Marvel Comics. The character is usually associated with the X-Men and the New Warriors.

A British mutant, Jono possessed the ability to cast energy blasts from his chest. He had limited control of his power and destroyed much of his chest and lower face when his powers emerged. He lost his powers on M-Day. For a time he used technology to give himself sonic based abilities. He regained his powers after the events of Age of X.

Jonothon was a member of the X-Men junior team Generation X. He was sullen and moody and had difficulty bonding with teammates. He has since been offered a permanent position in the X-Men's teaching staff.

Publication history
Created by writer Scott Lobdell and artist Chris Bachalo, he first appeared in Generation X #1 (November 1994).

Fictional character biography

Origin

Jonothon Evan Starsmore ("Jono" to his friends) is a native of London and a mutant who possesses a furnace of psionic energy in his chest. This power first manifested in an explosion during a party he was attending with then girlfriend Gayle Edgerton. Its initial manifestation destroyed much of his chest and lower face and crippled Gayle. As a result of his disfiguration, Jono can only speak via telepathy. He does not eat, drink, or breathe; it is believed that either the psionic energy sustains him without needing his vital organs, or that his body is merely a shell, and he is actually made up of psionic energy. This is further supported by the fact that Jono is immune to the "Death Factor" of Omega Red, meaning that he is not sustained by "life force".

The primary manifestation of his abilities is his ability to fire powerful blasts of psionic force. It has been implied at numerous times that Jono is potentially one of the most powerful mutants to walk the earth (most notably the scale of his mutagenic aura as seen by Emplate in Generation X #1, also at times when he is seen to 'cut loose' with his abilities) but his emotional issues have apparently prevented him from significantly exploring this potential. His disfiguration also left Jono sullen and angry and his teammates have often found him difficult to get along with.

Generation X

Shortly after his mutant powers manifested, Jonothon accepted an invitation to join Xavier's School for Gifted Youngsters. At the airport, he was attacked by Emplate, a vicious evil mutant who feeds on mutant genetic material to survive, and the fledgling team of Generation X (M, Husk, Synch, Skin, and Jubilee) arrived to fight Emplate off. Shortly after, Chamber convinced the crazed Penance to stop attacking the team, as he could sympathize with her freakish appearance; she came to live with the team.

Emplate captured Chamber with Gayle's help, and then imprisoned both of them. Gayle blamed Jono for ruining her life, but the two managed to get over their physical and mental trauma after the rest of Generation X freed them. Chamber later became romantically involved with Husk. Unfortunately, the relationship was strained as Jono often sabotaged the relationship, believing he could not offer her the normalcy he assumed she wanted. And despite the mutual attraction, future attempts to restart their relationship failed, as Jono's insecurities were always a hindrance. These issues also negatively impacted their ability to interact as platonic teammates.

Jono's greatest victory during the time he was with Generation X was when Banshee was attacked by the mutant serial killer Omega Red. With their teacher incapacitated, Chamber led the pursuit of the mutant and after the rest of the team was defeated, Chamber's immunity to Omega Red's death spores, as well as some tactical thinking on his part, enabled him to single-handedly defeat the killer.

Despite his time at the school, Jono was never able to gain full control of his abilities. Chamber grew even more depressed when he saw that Synch, who could duplicate a nearby mutant's powers, was more proficient with Chamber's own powers than Chamber himself was. When the school was outed as harboring mutant students, an anti-mutant group attacked the school. After Synch was killed preventing a bomb from killing nearby human students, the Generation X kids felt that their training was over, and they had to use their powers to help humanity. Chamber was the one student to be offered a place on the X-Men by Charles Xavier, but apparently failed to join the group when expected.

X-Man and Weapon X

After failing to join the X-Men, Chamber returned to London, where he hooked up with pop star Sugar Kane, creating a publicity blitz for the singer, but she and Chamber parted company after her manager staged her abduction by anti-mutant forces following a phony tabloid story about her pregnancy by Jono. The X-Men met with Chamber in London and persuaded him to join the team after all, after claiming that the X-Men offered a place that he could finally fit in. He remained on the team for some time, but often showed frustration with being treated as a junior member by his teammates, even after playing a role in the defeat of Vanisher and Mystique's Brotherhood of Mutants when they infiltrated Banshee's X-Corps.

Following a strained time on the X-Men, Chamber investigated the apparent murders of mutant students at Empire State University on their behalf. He became romantically entangled with the shapeshifting reptilian mutant, Amber, who was the only mutant student to remain at ESU when they shut down their mutant program, but the relationship quickly ended before it began when Amber came to believe he was only interested in her when she used her shape-shifting abilities to take on a more conventionally attractive form. After that he asked to be relieved from active duty with the X-Men, claiming that he still had much to learn.

While he was back at the school, Chamber saw Husk in the arms of Archangel. He also saw the death of his friend Skin after the mutant was crucified on the lawn of the school by the Church of Humanity. After an awkward period with Husk, the X-Men were called to a bar where Jono had apparently given into his anger. He attacked Archangel before Wolverine was able to subdue him. Chamber was turned over to the authorities and while in prison, locked in a power-dampening helmet, Chamber received a visit from Brent Jackson, who offered him an invitation to join the Weapon X program. He accepted. It was later revealed that the fight and public falling out with the X-Men had been planned to draw Weapon X into recruiting him. After infiltrating them, Weapon X restored his damaged body and he was sent on a mission to kill John Sublime. He apparently did so, convincing Weapon X of his loyalty, but after stowing aboard a transport to the Neverland concentration camp, he vanished. It was later revealed in the Weapon X: Days of Future Now miniseries that Chamber had been captured and brainwashed into loyalty to the program.

In the second Runaways series, it initially appeared Jono had damaged his face again and joined a new team of retired teenage superheroes called Excelsior, but it was revealed that this was merely Geoffrey Wilder, the enemy of the teenage team the Runaways impersonating him using a magic amulet.

Decimation

Following the warping of reality by the Scarlet Witch, Jono was one of the many mutants who were depowered when reality was restored. Apparently, his powers failed during a mission with Weapon X. It was revealed that Beast was able to save his life after the loss of his powers, but the exact circumstances are unknown. In Generation M #1, as his lower jaw, chest, and several fairly vital organs were missing once again, the X-Men left him to be cared for at a hospital on life support.

Jono was moved to a hospital in England, but was abducted by his therapist a few weeks later - his therapist being Frederick Slade, a member of the Clan Akkaba, the direct descendants of Apocalypse and distant relatives of Jono. Under orders of Ozymandias, Jono was afterwards completely healed by the Clan who gave him massive amounts of Apocalypse's blood, restoring his body. However, he took on the pigmentation and appearance of a younger version of Apocalypse. As a direct descendant himself of Apocalypse, Jono was automatically a member of the Clan and was even welcomed by its ruling council, but he rejected their offer to formally join them. Jono was then approached by the UK based superhero team Excalibur to join them too, but he also refused, claiming he just wanted to be left alone. A later scan of Jono's residual energy signature has revealed that his powers have possibly evolved to Omega-level. However, if Chamber has any such abilities, they appear to be latent.

New Warriors

Jono resurfaced as Decibel, a member of Night Thrasher's most recent incarnation of the New Warriors. In this new persona, Jono had a hi-tech suit, which gave him the ability to create solidified sound constructs. He revealed that he chose those powers because he did not want to be a weapon of destruction anymore and could now create. He served with the group for the duration, until it was decided that they should disband. He was last seen departing in the company of Jubilee, and other surviving members of the team.

Age of X
Jono eventually made his way to the X-Men's new Island nation of Utopia. Shortly after his arrival, one of the split-personalities of Xavier's son Legion re-wrote the history of the X-Men turning himself into a hero. In this re-written world, Jono was once again referred to as Chamber and had regained his lost mutant powers, but also lost the body restorations given to him by Clan Akkaba. When normality was finally restored, Jono was one of the few X-Men who retained their physical changes from this altered reality. Now once again in possession of a gaping hole in his chest and jaw, Jono submitted to observation by the X-Men's resident biologist, Dr. Kavita Rao.

Schism
Chamber is mentioned by the Stepford Cuckoos as responding to a Sentinel threat in Berlin alongside Warpath. After the conflict of leaders between Wolverine and Cyclops, Chamber chose to join Wolverine at the new X-Mansion, now the Jean Grey School for Higher Learning.

Wolverine and the X-Men
Chamber is now teaching a course on "Coping With Physical Changes" at the Jean Grey School for Higher Learning. Chamber is entrusted with the safety and security of the students when a violent threat is roaming the halls. He's shown defending his students from an attack by Weapon Omega while giving a lecture in class. Chamber was vaporized out of existence while battling one of Legion's multiple personalities, but was later restored to life when Legion later altered reality. When the school moves and reforms in Central Park, New York City, Chamber is again a teacher. He is shown mentoring a small group of students through emotional trauma and physical danger. He works closely with his former teammate Jubilee.

Krakoa
When Krakoa became a mutants-only nation, Jono was resurrected, and joined the newly reformed New Mutants, along with Mondo. They went on a mission to the Shi'ar Empire with the intent of bringing Cannonball to Krakoa. They were eventually made to transport Deathbird to Chandilar to be Majestrix Xandra Neramani's teacher, avoiding an assassination attempt by Oracle He was later seen working with Nightcrawler's Legionaries.

Powers and abilities
Jono's thoracic and abdominal cavities are a chamber for a furnace of psionic energy capable of nuclear fission whose output can be projected as wide blasts of concussive force or laser-like focused beams that disrupt atomic bonds. The initial manifestation of said powers has destroyed most of his internal organs along with his mouth and chest, effectively killing his body. Chamber requires no food or oxygen and is seemingly indestructible as he has disintegrated his own body along with D'spayre's down to their sub-atomic components in a kamikaze attack and later reconstituted himself (Generation X Annual '97).

Jono's appearance is so unusual that even other mutants are startled and repulsed. His bizarre physiology suggests he is actually a being of pure psionic energy inhabiting a dead organic shell that he can disintegrate and reassemble from memory, a hypothesis several characters have put forward in comics. Chamber can also project his thoughts into other people's minds, but cannot read the thoughts of others, which enables him to communicate without a mouth. At one point, fellow Generation X member Synch used his own mutant powers to tap into and copy Jono's powers and fly. Jono himself has never exhibited this ability before or since.

After being depowered by the events of House of M, Jono's body was rebuilt by Clan Akkaba in the image of Apocalypse and he later employed technology to mimic sonic powers as Decibel. These powers included flight, sonic blasts and the creation of solid energy constructs. He has since been restored to his original form and powers by the events of Age of X.

Reception
 In 2014, Entertainment Weekly ranked Chamber 35th in their "Let's rank every X-Man ever" list.

Other versions

Age of Apocalypse

In the Age of Apocalypse timeline, Chamber was a much different person from his mainstream counterpart. He was the leader of Generation Next under the training of Shadowcat and Colossus, who had rescued Chamber from Mikhail Rasputin, one of Apocalypse's Horsemen. His power had been discovered earlier and was placed under his control via a cybernetic chest plate used to regulate his power usage; as such, his face and body were whole with no parts lost to his power. He also had an open and passionate relationship with fellow mutant Husk. He was killed along with the rest of his team when they infiltrated Sugar Man's lair and were abandoned by Colossus.

Future X-Men
Within an alternate future timeline set 25 years ahead of current events. Jonothon Starsmore remains an X-Man to this day where many students of the Jean Grey School of Higher Learning have grown up and gone on to become both heroes and celebrities. In this particular era he and his love interest Paige Guthrie are converted into Brood by a new species of said parasite race resting beneath Dublin, Ireland. Luckily his fellow X-Man Wiccan had returned armed with powerful magics which purged the infection after the Uncanny Mutants were on the losing end of the conflict. In this era Jono had perfected his powers, being able to reconstruct his physical appearance in order to kiss his beloved.

He later died during a battle with the Shi'Ar after Daken had tricked the X-Men and Deathbird into getting him close enough to the M'Kraan Crystal so he could ascend to an Apocalypse level power base, detonating it to blow apart the battle cruiser they were on killing nearly everyone aboard.

Name
For all of the character's Generation X appearances, his name was spelled as Jonothon Starsmore. However, following his appearances in this title, his name started appearing spelled Jonothan, starting with his appearances in Uncanny X-Men. The reason for this change is unclear.

References

External links
Chamber at Marvel.com

British superheroes
Characters created by Scott Lobdell
Characters created by Chris Bachalo
Comics characters introduced in 1994
Fictional characters with disfigurements
Fictional characters with energy-manipulation abilities
Fictional characters with nuclear or radiation abilities
Fictional people from London
Fictional schoolteachers
Fictional secret agents and spies
Marvel Comics male superheroes
Marvel Comics mutants
Marvel Comics telepaths
Marvel Comics titles